The 2001–02 ECHL season was the 14th season of the East Coast Hockey League. Before the start of the season, the league saw one expansion franchise and five relocations, three of which were through the buying of the franchise rights of former clubs that had ceased operations. These relocations include the rights to the Columbus Chill moving to Reading, PA, the rights to the Hampton Roads Admirals moving to Columbus, GA, and the rights to the Miami Matadors relocating to the former ECHL market of Cincinnati, OH. The league also saw current franchises Birmingham Bulls move to Atlantic City, NJ and Tallahassee Tiger Sharks move to Macon, GA. The league also welcomed its fourth franchise from the state of South Carolina with an expansion franchise in the state's capital of Columbia, SC. The Louisiana IceGators finished first overall in the regular season, winning the Brabham Cup with the best record in league history. The Greenville Grrrowl won their first Kelly Cup sweeping the Dayton Bombers in four games.

During the opening weekend of the ECHL season, the league had a moment of silence for former South Carolina Stingrays player Mark Bavis, who had been killed in the September 11 terrorist attacks. Ryan Brindley, who was wearing #12 for the Stingrays in the previous season, changed to #55 after the team retired the number that Bavis had worn during his two seasons (1994–96) with the Stingrays.

Playoff format 
The ECHL realigned the playoff format for the season.

Northern Conference 
The top four teams in each division would qualify for the playoffs, with the division champions being ranked first in their brackets and the other qualified teams ranked by points. The first seeds will play the fourth seeds and the second seeds will play the third seeds in best-of-five series in the Division Semifinals. The winners will advance to the best-of-five Division Finals and the playoff winners of each division would play each other in a best-of-five Conference Championship series, with the winner advancing to the Kelly Cup Finals.

Southern Conference 
The top five teams in each division would qualify for the playoffs, with the division champions being ranked first in their brackets and the other qualified teams ranked by points. The fourth and fifth seeds of each division will play a single-game series in the Division Wild Card, with each winner advancing to play their division leader in the best-of-five Division Semifinal series, while the second seeds will play the third seeds in best-of-five series in the Division Semifinals. The winners will advance to the best-of-five Division Finals and the playoff winners of each division would play each other in a best-of-five Conference Championship series, with the winner advancing to the Kelly Cup Finals.

Regular season

Final standings 
Note: GP = Games played; W = Wins; L= Losses; T = Ties; GF = Goals for; GA = Goals against; Pts = Points; Green shade = Clinched playoff spot; Blue shade = Clinched division; (z) = Clinched home-ice advantage

Northern Conference

Southern Conference

Kelly Cup playoffs

Northern Conference

Bracket

Division semifinals

Division finals

Conference finals

Southern Conference

Bracket

Division Wild Card

Division semifinals

Division finals

Conference finals

Kelly Cup finals

ECHL awards

See also 
 ECHL
 ECHL All-Star Game
 Kelly Cup
 List of ECHL seasons

 
ECHL seasons
3